National Academy for Prisons Administration (NAPA) formerly known as Central Jail Staff Training Institute (CJSTI) is a Federal Government's training institute for prison staff of all four provinces of Pakistan. It operates under Ministry of Interior, Government of Pakistan. The Academy is situated on Ferozepur Road in Lahore, Pakistan and is adjacent to District Jail Lahore.

Address: NAPA, Camp Jail, Shama Chawk, Ferozpour Road, Lahore.

This National Academy for Prisons Administration (NAPA), Lahore is working under the Ministry of Interior, Government of Pakistan to fulfill Function No.28 of Rules of Business of the Interior Division read with SL#16 of the Federal Legislative List of the Constitution of Islamic Republic of Pakistan. It is the only National Level Academy which is imparting basic and professional training to all the Prison staff / Reclamation personnel (Probation & Parole Officers) of four Provinces, Azad Kashmir & Gilgit – Baltistan.

Recently Judges, Prosecutors and Police Officers are included to participate in Workshops / Seminars / Symposia on specialized subjects, the expertise of which are available at this only national level Academy.

The Academy fulfills the requirements of the United Nations Geneva Convention known as Standard Minimum Rules for Treatment of Prisoners 1955, for concerted training of Prison / Reclamation staff of the country on modern methods.

The Academy provides technico-professional training from Warders to Superintendents Jail on the challenging needs of Prison security and to run Prison Administration and Management on corrective and reformative lines as strongly advocated by Islam.

ESTABLISHMENT

As a sequel to high level Jail Reform Conference held in 1973, the Central Jail Staff Training Institute established in October 1974 has now been upgraded as National Academy for Prisons Administration (NAPA) was established in October 1974. It is presently located on Ferozepur Road, Lahore adjacent to District Jail, Shama Bus Stop, Lahore, Pakistan.

ROLE / OBJECTIVES

The major role of this National Academy is to provide academic and practical / professional training to all officers and lower staff of the prison department. The objectives of this Academy are as under :-

1. Progressive professional training of entire prison officers and ranks of Prison Departments of all the Provinces, Gilgit - Baltistan and Azad Jammu & Kashmir on uniform basis.

2. Specialized training of senior prison staff, in important disciplines of studies including human rights.

3. Physical training of prison staff on ensuring physical fitness and grooming of officers/ranks in skills to handle crisis situations.

4. Training of Probation and Parole Officers in rehabilitation and correction techniques.

5. Orientation training of officers of other departments relevant to prison affairs.

6. Research and Development in the fields of prison management.

7. Computer Training of Prison Staff to produce computer literates.

8. Expert advice to Ministry of Interior and prison departments on legal and administrative matters related to prisons.

9. Maintenance of comprehensive data base to provide information regarding prisons and all other related fields to assist in policy planning at higher level.

10. Coordination of all training and other affairs of prisons with the Prisons Departments on behalf of the Ministry of Interior.

11. Advising prison staff on matters pertaining to psycho-social, and environmental aspects of inmates and providing corrective counseling for reformation.

12. Being a focal point, collection, collation and updating prisons/prisoners data from all over the country.

13. Attending the National Assembly Questions / Senate Motions moved by MNAs/Senators.

14. Advising different Universities of the country on psycho-social and legal aspects on their request.

See also
 Government of Pakistan
 Punjab Prisons (Pakistan)
 National Police Academy of Pakistan
 Central Jail Faisalabad
 Central Jail Lahore
 Central Jail Mianwali
 Prison Officer
 Headquarter Jail
 Central Jail Rawalpindi
 District Jail Rawalpindi

External links
 

Law enforcement in Pakistan
Law enforcement agencies of Pakistan
Prisons in Pakistan
Pakistan federal departments and agencies
Prison-related organizations